The women's single skating competition of the 1960 Winter Olympics was held at the Blyth Arena in Squaw Valley, California, United States. The compulsory figures section took place on Sunday 21 February 1960 with the free skating section concluding the event two days later. Each judge ranked each skater by Ordinal Placement from first to last place. If a skater was ranked first by a majority of the judges, that skater was placed first overall, this process was repeated for each place. If more than one skater had a majority ranking for the same position then a series of tiebreaks were in place, indicated in order in the result section.

Carol Heiss won gold for the United States going one better from her silver medal at the 1956 Olympics.

Results

Referee:
  Josef Dědič

Assistant Referee:
  Alexander D.C. Gordon

Judges:
  Martin Felsenreich
  John Greig
  Emil Skákala
  Adolf Walker
  Pamela Davis
  Giovanni de Mori
  Shotaro Kobayashi
  Charlotte Benedict-Stieber
  Howell Janes

References

External links
 1960 Squaw Valley Official Olympic Report
 sports-reference

Figure skating at the 1960 Winter Olympics
Oly
Fig